Anchors is the tenth studio album by country music musician Will Hoge released on August 11, 2017.

Background
After touring for his previous album, Small Town Dreams, Hoge disbanded his group and started to write songs at home and toured solo. After a period of depression, Hoge saw his children get together in the family garage and perform songs. Hoge said, "I watched from the bedroom window and it was like a portal back to the time when you’re not thinking about touring companies or LLCs or insurance for employees...I was 16 or 17 when I got my first guitar and wanted to write songs and wanted to do this professionally. Seeing them really over the next couple of days helped me re-center what I wanted to do and I wrote that song, ’17.'"

Reception
The album has been met with positive reception. Writing for AllMusic, Thom Jurek called the album "honest" and Hoge a "master storyteller".

Track listing

Personnel
Adapted from LP liner notes
Will Hoge – writer, producer
Ray Kennedy – mixing, additional engineer 
David Axelrod – engineer
Zaq Reynolds – assistant engineer
Andrew Mendelson – mastering engineer

References

Will Hoge albums
Americana albums
2017 albums